

List of Ambassadors

Oded Joseph (Non-Resident, Nairobi) 2019 -
Noah Gal Gendler (Non-Resident, Nairobi) 2017 - 2019
Jacob Keidar (Non-Resident, Nairobi) 2007 - 2011
Itzhak Gerberg (Non-Resident, Jerusalem) 2002 - 2003
Moshe Itan 1990 - 1993
Zeev Dover 1985 - 1987
Meir Gavish 1978 - 1981
Shammay Zvi Laor 1974 - 1978
Meir Joffe 1966

References

Malawi
Israel